Howard Kane (born Howard Kirchembaum, 1941), also known as Howie Kane was a member of Jay and the Americans.  He sang vocals for the band between 1960–1973 and then from 2006-present.

Kane left Jay and the Americans, but rejoined a new version of the group after 2006, and remains with it as of 2017.

References

1941 births
Living people
American male pop singers